Hung Heung Lo Fung is a hill with a height of  on Hong Kong Island, Hong Kong, close to Jardine's Lookout.

Wilson Trail Stage 2 passes near the summit of Hung Heung Lo Fung.

See also 
 List of mountains, peaks and hills in Hong Kong
 Siu Ma Shan
 Braemar Hill

References 

Butler
Eastern District, Hong Kong